Nicholas Groff (born April 19, 1980) is an American paranormal investigator, musician, and television personality. Groff was the lead investigator for the television series Paranormal Lockdown. He was a co-investigator, executive producer, editor and cameraman on Ghost Adventures from seasons 1–10.

Early life
On April 19, 1980, Nick Groff was born in San Jose, California. Raised in New England, he has been fascinated with the paranormal since childhood, because of his passion for horror movies and some inexplicable experiences within his home and family. Two years after a near-death experience, while at home alone, he says he saw a ghostly black figure. In a 2012 interview, Groff questioned, "Was it my imagination? Or was it something from my accident that made me more open to their world?"

Career

Ghost Adventures

In 2004, Nick Groff teamed up with Zak Bagans and Aaron Goodwin to produce a documentary-style series called Ghost Adventures. On November 24, 2014, Groff announced that he would not be returning to Ghost Adventures for the upcoming season.

Other projects
Groff has since produced his own series, Ghost Stalkers (2014) and Paranormal Lockdown (2016–19), in which he was the lead investigator and executive producer.

Filmography

References

External links
 

1980 births
Living people
American documentary film producers
American male musicians
American reality television producers
American television hosts
Male actors from San Jose, California
Paranormal investigators
People from Nashua, New Hampshire
University of Nevada, Las Vegas alumni
Ghost Adventures
Television producers from California
Film producers from California